ArtFutura is an annual festival of digital culture.  It was first staged in Barcelona in 1990.  Other sites have included Buenos Aires, Ibiza, London, and Montevideo.

ArtFutura is directed by Montxo Algora.

Editions 

 1990 Virtual Reality
 1991 Cybermedia
 1992 Global Mind
 1993 Artificial Life
 1994 Cyberculture
 1995 Virtual Communities
 1996 Robots & Knowbots
 1997 The Future of the Future
 1998 Second Skin
 1999 Digital Leisure
 2000 Internet as Cyborg
 2001 Collective Art
 2002 The Web as Canvas
 2003 The Painted Word
 2004 Augmented Reality
 2005 Living Objects . Sensitive Spaces
 2006 Data Aesthetics
 2007 The Next Web
 2008 Souls and Machines
 2009 From Virtual Reality to Social Networks
 2010 We Live in Public
 2011 Reviewing the Future
 2012 Our Culture is Digital
 2013 Feeding the Web
 2014 The Digital Promise
 2015 Collective Intelligence
 2016 From Virtual Reality to 3D Internet
 2017 Digital Creatures
 2018 / 2019 Humanized Technology
 2022 / 2023 The Future Arrives Early

Main venue and CircuitoFutura 

ArtFutura contains conferences, workshops, exhibitions, live shows and an audiovisual program which includes the latest novelties in digital creativity.

Much of the ArtFutura content is developed in Barcelona and Madrid although connections by means of video conferences are established with other cities in which the festival is held.

Among the cities in which ArtFutura is presented are included Buenos Aires, Bogotá, Granada, Lisbon, London, Madrid, México DF, Montevideo, Palma de Mallorca, Paris, Punta del Este,  São Paulo, Santiago de Chile, Torino, Tenerife, Vigo and Vitoria-Gasteiz.

Souls&Machines 

GaleriaFutura is the division of ArtFutura destined to the exhibitions of digital art.

One of its most important projects was the "Souls&Machines" ( Máquinas&Almas) exhibit that was presented at the Museo Nacional Centro de Arte Reina Sofía, Madrid, Spain and curated by Montxo Algora and José Luis de Vicente.

It included the works of Paul Friedlander, Sachiko Kodama, Theo Jansen, Daniel Rozin, Chico McMurtrie, Rafael Lozano-Hemmer, Daniel Canogar, Evru, David Byrne, David Hanson, Vuk Ćosić, Pierre Huyghe, Harun Farocki, Muntadas, Ben Rubin, Mark Hansen, Antoni Abad and Natalie Jeremijenko.

Catalog 

For each edition of the festival, ArtFutura edits a printed catalog which includes a selection of articles on digital art and culture.

External links 
 ArtFutura website
 El País (in Spanish)
 ArtFutura Catalogs
 Video - Souls&Machines at TVE
 Video - Souls&Machines
 Exhibition Catalog - Reina Sofía Museum

Digital art
New media art festivals
Arts festivals in Argentina
Film festivals in Argentina